Yvan Muller (born 16 August 1969 in Altkirch, Haut-Rhin) is a French auto racing driver most noted for success in touring car racing. He is a four-time World Touring Car Champion, winning the title in 2008 with SEAT, in 2010 and 2011 with Chevrolet and in 2013 with RML. He was British Touring Car Champion in 2003 with Vauxhall.

Racing career

Single-seaters
After competing in French Formula Renault and French Formula Three, he won the British Formula Two championship title in 1992 and competed in the FIA Formula 3000 Championship in 1993. His sister Cathy Muller had previously contested four races in this category between 1986 and 1988.

French Supertouring Championship, Italian Superturismo and Super Tourenwagen Cup
1994 Yvan Muller made his debut in French Supertouring Championship with Team BMW Fina finishing third while the following year he became Champion. In 1996 due to lack of manufacturers involved he decide to pass to Audi Sport Italia and to compete in Italian Superturismo Championship finishing fourth overall. After one season he moved to STW in order to develop the new Audi A4 front wheel. He ended seventh and in 1998 he passed to BTCC.

Three years later Muller was called by N.Technology to run with Alfa Romeo 156 to help Alfa Romeo and Giovanardi to win the European Super Touring Championship 2001.

British Touring Car championship
Yvan Muller started his BTCC career in 1998 replacing Audi Vice Champion Frank Biela that in the while came back in STW. Muller thanks to his major experience with front wheel Audi A4 got three podium and finished 7th in the 1998 championship while his teammate John Bintcliffe finished just 15th. After Audi withdraw at the end of 1998 BTCC, Yvan moved to the Vauxhall Motorsport team run by Triple Eight Race Engineering for 1999 alongside John Cleland using the Vauxhall Vectra. He would win his first BTCC race at round 7 Brands Hatch, he would eventually finish 6th in the championship while teammate John Cleland finished 13th. 2000 was the last year for the Super Tourers in the BTCC. Muller drove for Vauxhall again while Jason Plato and Vincent Radermecker joined after leaving Renault and Volvo who pulled out at the end of 1999. The Frenchman finished as the top driver for Vauxhall in 4th in the championship behind all three Ford drivers (Alain Menu, Anthony Reid and Rickard Rydell).

In 2001 the regulations changed to the new Touring Cars. Vauxhall debuted its BTC-T Vauxhall Astra Coupe for both the Vauxhall Motorsport team and Egg Sport both run by Triple Eight Race Engineering. The Astra was the car to beat against its competitors. Muller and teammate Plato fought for the championship the whole season. Muller finished 2nd in the championship after his car caught fire in the final race leaving Plato as the champion. 2002 BTCC would be much of the same. The Astra was the best car against Honda, Peugeot, MG and Proton despite some reliability problems throughout the season. James Thompson moved up to Vauxhall Motorsport after 2001 champion Jason Plato left to drive in NASCAR. Yvan finished 2nd in the championship again behind teammate James Thompson after more bad luck during the season and last few races caused him to again miss out on the title. He would again drive in 2003 for Vauxhall. The team now called VX Racing continued racing the Astra Coupe and also streached to a three car works Vauxhall/VXR team after Egg Sport was dropped. The Astra Coupe was again the car to beat and Yvan Muller and James Thompson again fought for the championship. Muller won his first title from teammate Thompson after a very strong season.
2004 would be the last year for the Astra Coupe. The Astra was challenged very hard in 2004 by Honda, MG and Seat making its debut with former Vauxhall driver and 2001 champion Jason Plato, but consistency lead both the VX Racing teammates of Yvan Muller and James Thompson to fight for the championship. Thompson won his second championship from Muller by one point.
2005 saw the new BTC-T Vauxhall Astra Sport Hatch replace the extremely successful Astra Coupe for Vauxhall. The Astra Sport Hatch was out classed by the new Honda Integra and prevented Muller from winning a second title. He finished second in the championship for the 4th time in 5 years, making a decision at the end of 2005, Muller left the BTCC to drive for Seat in the WTCC.

V8 Supercar
Muller competed in the two Australian V8 Supercar endurance races each year for a number of years, taking victory at the 2005 Sandown 500 with local driver Craig Lowndes in their Betta Electrical Triple Eight BA Falcon. In the same year, he was also involved in one of the most memorable incidents at the Mount Panorama for the Bathurst 1000, where in the lead, Craig Lowndes clipped the wall at Reid Park, and after a watts link change, another incident saw a wheel part company from Paul Dumbrell's car and hit the windscreen of Lowndes. In 2006 and 2007, Muller has been unable to race in the two annual enduros due to a clash with WTCC.

World Touring Car championship

SEAT (2006–2009)

On 12 November 2005 it was officially announced that he would be switching to the 2006 World Touring Car Championship (WTCC), driving for SEAT Sport. A pair of 2nd places in the opening meeting in Monza showed that he was a likely frontrunner, his first win then coming in round 5 at Brands Hatch. He was classified 4th at the end of the season with 62pts.

He finished 2nd in the 2007 WTCC with 81pts, and he lost the title to Guernsey driver Andy Priaulx (BMW 320si) during the last race in Macau where his SEAT León TDI suffered a fuel pump failure when he was leading the first race with one lap to go, which put him out of race 2 at Macau.

He opened 2008 with a victory at Curitiba, Brazil. Yvan Muller was battling for the championship, primarily with teammate Gabriele Tarquini during the season, and finally won the championship at the final round in Macau.

In 2009, Yvan was beaten to the title by teammate Tarquini, taking four victories.

Chevrolet (2010–2012)

He moved to rival team Chevrolet in 2010. He scored pole position and won his first race for the team in Brazil. He took further wins in Italy and the United Kingdom to become the 2010 World Touring Car Champion and the first driver to win the title for two teams.

Muller stayed with the team in 2011. At the end of the year he was champion once again after a close battle with teammate Rob Huff, matching Andy Priaulx's record of three WTCC titles. Muller stayed with Chevrolet in 2012.

RML (2013)
Muller stayed with the RML team for 2013 season, now racing as an independent entry after the withdrawal of Chevrolet from the World Touring Car Championship. He drove a Chevrolet Cruze 1.6T alongside former Team Aon driver Tom Chilton. He won both races at the season opening Race of Italy in wet conditions to score his first victories as an independent touring car driver.

Citroën (2014–2016)

In August 2013 it was announced that Muller would join Citroën Racing for the 2014 World Touring Car Championship season alongside nine–time World Rally Champion Sébastien Loeb in a two–year deal.

Muller is founder and team principal of Yvan Muller Racing, which enters cars in various motorsport disciplines including sports car racing, and also helps to train young drivers.

Muller announced that the 2016 season would be his last in the WTCC, as he was retiring from the sport to concentrate on his family and race team.

Volvo (2017)
During 2017 he took on a role as test- and development-driver for Polestar Cyan Racing. He returned to the championship to replace Nestor Girolami for the season finale in Qatar.

M Racing-YMR (2018)
In 2018 returned to full-time racing with a couple self-owned Hyundai i30 N TCRs for himself and Thed Björk. He finished runner-up in the drivers championship and M Racing-YMR was the teams champions.

Cyan Racing Lynk & Co (2019-2020)
For 2019 he returned to Cyan Racing driving one of four Lynk & Co 03 TCR.

Other racing categories
He primarily races in touring cars, but also participates in other categories.
In particular, he has won the Andros Trophy Ice Racing Championship 10 times (a record), with 46 race victories (also a record).

During the early years of his career, he competed in the 24 Hours of Le Mans in 1993 and 1996, but did not finish. He was originally entered to take part in the 1999 race in an Audi R8C but withdrew from the squad before any official running.

In 2007, he participated in the Dakar Rally. In 2009 (following the 2008 cancellation) he also participated in the Dakar Rally in South America, but he withdrew during the 5th stage. He represented France in the 2007 Race of Champions, alongside Sébastien Bourdais. He participated in the Rallye de France–Alsace in a Citroën Xsara WRC, a round of the 2010 World Rally Championship.

Racing record

Complete International Formula 3000 results
(key) (Races in bold indicate pole position) (Races in italics indicate fastest lap)

Complete Italian Touring Car Championship results
(key) (Races in bold indicate pole position) (Races in italics indicate fastest lap)

Complete Super Tourenwagen Cup results
(key) (Races in bold indicate pole position) (Races in italics indicate fastest lap)

Complete British Touring Car Championship results
(key) Races in bold indicate pole position (1 point awarded – 1998–2002 all races, 2003–present just in first race) Races in italics indicate fastest lap (1 point awarded – 2001–present all races) * signifies that driver lead race for at least one lap (1 point given – 1998–2002 just in feature race, 2003–present all races)

Complete European Touring Car Championship results
(key) (Races in bold indicate pole position) (Races in italics indicate fastest lap)

† – Did not finish the race, but was classified as he completed over 90% of the race distance.

Complete World Touring Car Championship results
(key) (Races in bold indicate pole position) (Races in italics indicate fastest lap)

† Did not finish the race, but was classified as he completed over 90% of the race distance.

Complete World Touring Car Cup results
(key) (Races in bold indicate pole position) (Races in italics indicate fastest lap)

† Driver did not finish the race, but was classified as he completed over 90% of the race distance.

WTCC statistics

24 Hours of Le Mans results

Complete World Rally Championship results

Complete V8 Supercar results

+ Guest Driver

References

External links

 
 

1969 births
Living people
People from Altkirch
French racing drivers
British Touring Car Championship drivers
World Touring Car Championship drivers
World Touring Car Champions
24 Hours of Le Mans drivers
French Formula Three Championship drivers
Off-road racing drivers
International Formula 3000 drivers
British Formula 3000 Championship drivers
British Touring Car Championship Champions
TC 2000 Championship drivers
Supercars Championship drivers
Motorsport team owners
European Touring Car Championship drivers
World Rallycross Championship drivers
Sportspeople from Haut-Rhin
World Touring Car Cup drivers
Karting World Championship drivers
Citroën Racing drivers
Rocketsports Racing drivers
Audi Sport drivers
BMW M drivers
Oreca drivers
Cupra Racing drivers